Ali Khalafalla (born 13 May 1996) is an Egyptian Olympic swimmer. He represented his country at the 2016 Summer Olympics and 2020 Summer Olympics. He placed 23rd in the 50 Freestyle, in Rio 2016. In Tokyo 2020, he placed 24th in the same event. A feat that has never been accomplished in Egypt's history.  

After breaking the Egyptian record that stood strong for 22 years, he set a new Egyptian record in California in 2017 which paved the way to become the fastest Egyptian swimmer in Egypt's history with a time of 22.12. He further took Egypt's sprint swimming further after he clocked his personal best in Tarragona, Spain at the 2018 Mediterranean Games. Thus becoming the first and only Egyptian to break the 22 second barrier in the 50 freestyle with a time of 21.97 seconds. in 2021, the best time and Egyptian record in the 50 meters freestyle was lowered and currently stands at 21.94.  

He attended Fork Union Military Academy in Fork Union, Virginia for three years before graduating. At FUMA, he led the team to a back-to-back VISAA State Swimming Championships titles in 2013 and 2014. He currently holds the Virginia state records in the 50 and 100 freestyle events.

Ali then attended Indiana University from 2015-2019 and played a role in the team's success to two Big Ten Championships Titles, and a third place finish at the 2018 NCAA Swimming Championships. He graduated in 2019 with a Management in Public Affairs Bachelor's Degree.

References

External links 
 

1996 births
Living people
Egyptian male swimmers
Swimmers at the 2016 Summer Olympics
Swimmers at the 2020 Summer Olympics
Olympic swimmers of Egypt
Mediterranean Games bronze medalists for Egypt
Mediterranean Games medalists in swimming
Swimmers at the 2018 Mediterranean Games
Swimmers at the 2019 African Games
African Games gold medalists for Egypt
African Games silver medalists for Egypt
Indiana Hoosiers men's swimmers
African Games medalists in swimming
Sportspeople from Cairo